A comparison of apples and oranges occurs when two items or groups of items are compared that cannot be practically compared, typically because of inherent, fundamental and/or qualitative differences between the items.

The idiom, comparing apples and oranges, refers to the apparent differences between items which are popularly thought to be incomparable or incommensurable, such as apples and oranges. The idiom may also be used to indicate that a false analogy has been made between two items, such as where an apple is faulted for not being a good orange.

Variants

The idiom is not unique to English. In Latin American Spanish, it is usually  (comparing potatoes and sweet potatoes) or commonly for all varieties of Spanish  (comparing pears with apples). In some other languages the term for 'orange' derives from 'apple', suggesting not only that a direct comparison between the two is possible, but that it is implicitly present in their names. Fruit other than apples and oranges can also be compared; for example, apples and pears are compared in Danish, Dutch, German, Spanish, Swedish, Croatian, Czech, Romanian, Hungarian, Italian, Slovak, Slovene, Luxembourgish, Serbian, and Turkish. In Czech, the idiom  literally means 'to mix apples with pears'.

Some languages use completely different items, such as the Serbian  (comparing grandmothers and toads), or the Romanian  (the grandmother and the machine gun);  (the cow and the longjohns), or the Welsh  (as different as honey and butter), while some languages compare dissimilar properties of dissimilar items. For example, an equivalent Danish idiom,  means "What is highest, the Round Tower or a thunderclap?", referring to the size of the former and the sound of the latter. In Russian, the phrase  (to compare warm and soft) is used. In Polish, the expression  is used, meaning "What has (is) gingerbread for a windmill?".

A number of more exaggerated comparisons are sometimes made, in cases in which the speaker believes the two objects being compared are radically different. For example, "oranges with orangutans", "apples with dishwashers", and so on. In English, different fruits, such as pears, plums, or lemons are sometimes substituted for oranges in this context.

Sometimes the two words sound similar, for example, Romanian  (apples with pears) and the Hungarian  (the season with the fashion).

Published comparisons

Scientific

At least two tongue-in-cheek scientific studies have been conducted on the subject, each of which concluded that apples can be compared with oranges fairly easily and on a low budget and the two fruits are quite similar.

The first study, conducted by Scott Sandford of the NASA Ames Research Center, used infrared spectroscopy to analyze both apples and oranges. The study, which was published in the satirical science magazine Annals of Improbable Research, concluded: "... the comparing apples and oranges defense should no longer be considered valid. This is a somewhat startling revelation. It can be anticipated to have a dramatic effect on the strategies used in arguments and discussions in the future."

A second study, written by Stamford Hospital's surgeon-in-chief James Barone and published in the British Medical Journal, noted that the phrase apples and oranges was appearing with increasing frequency in the medical literature, with some notable articles comparing "Desflurane and propofol" and "Salmeterol and ipratropium" with "apples and oranges". The study also found that both apples and oranges were sweet, similar in size, weight, and shape, that both are grown in orchards, and both may be eaten, juiced, and so on. The only significant differences found were in terms of seeds (the study used seedless oranges), the involvement of Johnny Appleseed, and color.

The Annals of Improbable Research subsequently noted that the "earlier investigation was done with more depth, more rigour, and, most importantly, more expensive equipment" than the British Medical Journal study.

Economic
On April Fools' Day 2014, The Economist compared worldwide production of apples and oranges from 1983 to 2013, however noted them to be "unrelated variables".

In teaching the use of units
While references to comparing apples and oranges are often a rhetorical device, references to adding apples and oranges are made in the case of teaching students the proper uses of units. Here, the admonition not to "add apples and oranges" refers to the requirement that two quantities with different units may not be combined by addition, although they may always be combined in ratio form by multiplication, so that multiplying ratios of apples and oranges is allowed. Similarly, the concept of this distinction is often used metaphorically in elementary algebra.

The admonition is really more of a mnemonic, since in general counts of objects have no intrinsic unit and, for example, a number count of apples may be dimensionless or have dimension fruit; in either of these two cases, apples and oranges may indeed be added.

See also

Agree to differ
Ambiguity effect
Categorization
Exception that proves the rule
Falsifiability
Genetic fallacy
Law of identity
Nix v. Hedden, a U.S. Supreme Court case that partially defined "fruit" in the context of import tariffs.
Objection to the consideration of a question
Premise
Rhetorical device
Semantic differential
Umbrella term

References

English-language idioms
Humour
Apples
Oranges (fruit)
Comparisons
Metaphors referring to food and drink